Perfect Harmony may refer to:

Perfect Harmony (film), a 1991 Disney Channel film
Perfect Harmony (musical), an a cappella stage musical
Perfect Harmony (painting), a 1719 painting by Antoine Watteau
Perfect Harmony (TV series), an American musical comedy series
Perfect Harmony, a 1998 novel by Barbara Wood
Perfect Harmony: The Whiffenpoofs in China, a 1985 documentary by Megan Callaway